Panos M. Pardalos is a Greek scientist and engineer, currently a Distinguished Professor and the Paul and Heidi Brown Preeminent Professor in Industrial and Systems Engineering at University of Florida.

He was elected to the 2006 class of Fellows of the Institute for Operations Research and the Management Sciences.

References

Year of birth missing (living people)
Living people
Greek emigrants to the United States
University of Florida faculty
21st-century American engineers
Fellows of the Institute for Operations Research and the Management Sciences